Haseena may refer to:

 Haseena (film), a 2018 Indian Hindi-language film
 Haseena, a 1998 album by Lesle Lewis

Given name
 Haseena Begum (born 1961), Pakistani politician
 Haseena Haneef, known as Usha, Indian actress
 Haseena Khan, Bangladeshi scientist and professor
 Haseena Moin (1941–2021), Pakistani playwright and writer for radio and television
 Haseena Malik, a fictional character in the TV series Maddam Sir

See also
 Hasina (disambiguation)